Rami Miron (רמי מירון; also "Meron"; born January 17, 1957) is an Israeli former Olympic wrestler.

Early life
Miron is Jewish, and was born in Baku in Azerbaijan in the Soviet Union.  He made aliyah (immigrated to Israel) from Russia in the Soviet Union.

Wrestling career
In 1975, as a lightweight Miron finished 6th in the World Youth Championships, and 7th in the World Championships. He also won a gold medal in the 1975 Tel Aviv International Wrestling Tournament, and was awarded the "Sportsman of the Year" award by the Israeli newspaper Maariv.

Miron competed for Israel at the 1976 Summer Olympics in Montreal, Canada, at the age of 19, in Wrestling--Men's Lightweight, Freestyle.  He came in 7th. He defeated Ronald Joseph of the US Virgin Islands, Lennart Lundell of Sweden, and Zsigmond Kelevitz of Australia, while losing to János Kocsis of Hungary and in the quarter-finals to gold medal winner Pavel Pinigin of the Soviet Union. When he competed in the Olympics, he was 5-6.5 (170 cm) tall, and weighed 150 lbs (68 kg).	

In 1977 Miron finished 4th at the World Championships.

References

External links

Sportspeople from Baku
Soviet male sport wrestlers
Olympic wrestlers of Israel
Jewish wrestlers
Israeli Jews
Israeli people of Azerbaijani-Jewish descent
Soviet emigrants to Israel
Azerbaijani Jews
Soviet Jews
Azerbaijani male sport wrestlers
1957 births
Living people
Israeli male sport wrestlers
Azerbaijani emigrants to Israel
Wrestlers at the 1976 Summer Olympics